Mantaro may refer to:

Mantarō, a masculine Japanese given name
Mantaro Valley, a valley in Peru
Mantaro River, a river in Peru